Horbury and South Ossett is a former ward in the metropolitan borough of the City of Wakefield, West Yorkshire, England.  The area covered by the ward contains 26 listed buildings that are recorded in the National Heritage List for England.  Of these, two are listed at Grade I, the highest of the three grades, and the others are at Grade II, the lowest grade.  The area contains the town of Horbury, the south part of the town of Ossett, and the surrounding region.  Most of the listed buildings are houses.  The other listed buildings include three churches, grave covers in a churchyard, a public house, a former lock-up, a former school, buildings in a convent, a gas decontamination centre, and two items on the Calder and Hebble Navigation, a lock, and a lock marker stone.


Key

Buildings

References

Citations

Sources

 

Lists of listed buildings in West Yorkshire